The genus Jaculus is a member of the Dipodinae subfamily of dipodoid rodents (jerboas). Jaculus species are distributed in desert and semi-arid regions across northern Africa, the Sahara, the Horn of Africa, Arabia, the Middle East, and Central Asia.

Collectively, the species within the genus may be commonly referred to as "desert jerboas", although this more particularly applied to the lesser Egyptian jerboa (Jaculus jaculus).

Species
The following species are recognised for the genus Jaculus:
 Blanford's jerboa, Jaculus blanfordi
 Lesser Egyptian jerboa, Jaculus jaculus
 Greater Egyptian jerboa, Jaculus orientalis
 Thaler's jerboa Jaculus thaleri
 African hammada jerboa Jaculus hirtipes

References

Sources

 Holden, M. E. and G. G. Musser. 2005. Family Dipodidae. pp. 871–893 in Mammal Species of the World a Taxonomic and Geographic Reference. D. E. Wilson and D. M. Reeder eds. Johns Hopkins University Press, Baltimore.
 

 
Dipodidae
 
Taxa named by Johann Christian Polycarp Erxleben
Rodent genera
Rodents of North Africa